Maxen Kapo (born 19 January 2001) is a French professional footballer who plays as a midfielder for Swiss Promotion League club Étoile Carouge, on loan from Lausanne-Sport.

Club career

Paris Saint-Germain
An academy graduate of Paris Saint-Germain, Kapo signed his first professional contract on 14 March 2019. However, despite four appearances on the bench during the 2020–21 season, he failed to make a breakthrough in the first team.

Lausanne-Sport
On 17 June 2021, Kapo joined Swiss Super League club Lausanne-Sport. He signed a four-year contract with the club. He made his professional debut on 7 August in a 3–1 league defeat against Grasshopper.

Étoile Carouge (loan)
In July 2022, Kapo joined Swiss Promotion League club Étoile Carouge on a season long loan deal.

International career
Kapo is a France youth international. He made his debut for the France U19 team on 25 February 2020 in a 3–1 defeat against Portugal.

Personal life
Born in France, Kapo is of Ivorian descent. His uncle, Olivier, is a former France international footballer, who was part of French squad that won the 2003 FIFA Confederations Cup.

References

External links
 
 
 

2001 births
Living people
Footballers from Essonne
French footballers
France youth international footballers
French sportspeople of Ivorian descent
Association football midfielders
FC Lausanne-Sport players
Étoile Carouge FC players
Swiss Super League players
Swiss Promotion League players
French expatriate footballers
French expatriate sportspeople in Switzerland
Expatriate footballers in Switzerland